JayC Food Stores is an American supermarket chain based in Petersburg, Indiana. , the chain operates 64
stores in Southern Indiana. JayC has been a division of Kroger since 1999.

History

Early history
JayC was founded in 1863 by Swiss immigrant John C. Groub, who with his wife Elizabeth opened the chain's first store on South Chestnut Street in the city of Seymour. The success of the business allowed them to move to larger premises in 1871 and add a wholesale department. Profits by 1885 had reached US$80,000.

John C. Groub died in 1888, passing the management of the company to his son Theodore and his son-in-law William Masters, an experienced grocer.  Theodore later handed the running of the company to his sons Thomas and John.

The company's grocery wholesale business waned in the 1910s and 1920s, prompting the company to concentrate more on retail. Under the name of JayC Food Store of Scottsburg, adopted in 1927, the company grew to a peak of 44 retail locations in the 1940s. From the 1960s to the 1980s, JayC reduced the number of locations it operated and expanded the size of those it kept to offer a wider selection of foods.  By 1994, JayC had 900 employees, and by 1997 had grown to more than 2,700, making it the largest private retail employer in Indiana.  By the end of 1998 the company operated 30 stores, including three Foods Plus locations and three Ruler Foods store locations (JayC's discount banner).

Acquisition by Kroger

In January 1999, the John C. Groub Co. was acquired by Kroger, which continues to operate 22 JayC locations. The Foods Plus stores have been renamed to JayC Plus.

Under the ownership of Kroger, the JayC division grew its Ruler Foods brand to 13 stores at the end of 2012, including the first store outside of Indiana.  Some of the added Ruler Foods were conversions from the JayC brand, which has 23 stores at the end of 2012.

A major remodel project for the Columbus, Indiana JayC Foods (store #008) is planned to begin in August 2016. The remodel will include updates and improvements to the existing store infrastructure, expansion of the beer and wine selection, adjustments to grocery stock that will result in an increase of in-stock product size options as well as product varieties based on information gathered from JayC Foods (store #008) customer purchase data and/or JayC Foods (store #008) customer request history, changes to some aisles in regard to length/width/shelving structure, updates to check-out stations, and other improvements for functionality and customer satisfaction increases.

Information regarding additions of an in-store pharmacy and/or self-check-out stations have been rumored but are not confirmed at this time to be included parts of the 2016 remodel plan for the Columbus, Indiana location of JayC Foods (store #008). Changes to store management, store operating name, or divisional inclusion are not expected parts of the 2016 remodel project as of this date.

Today

As of 2018, JayC has been included in the Kroger Louisville division, with Ruler Foods now having its own division.

References

External links
JayC Food Stores homepage
The Kroger Company

Kroger
Companies based in Indiana
American companies established in 1862
Retail companies established in 1862
Supermarkets of the United States
1862 establishments in Indiana
Jackson County, Indiana